The 1959 SCCA National Sports Car Championship season was the ninth season of the Sports Car Club of America's National Sports Car Championship. It began April 5, 1959, and ended November 15, 1959, after fourteen races.

Schedule

 Feature race

Season results
Feature race overall winners in bold.

 D Modified were classified with C Modified at VIR.
 H Production were classified with G Production at VIR.
 J Production were classified with I Production at VIR.
 C Production were classified with B Production at Bridgehampton.
 B and C Production were classified together at Lime Rock; the combined class was won by Bob Grossman's CP Ferrari.  The highest-finishing BP car was Roy Tuerke's Chevrolet Corvette in 2nd.
 D Modified were classified with C Modified at Lime Rock.
 C Modified were classified with B Modified at Buckley Field.
 C Production were classified with B Production at Buckley Field.
 C and D Modified were classified together at Riverside; the combined class was won by Dick Morgensen's DP Ferrari.  The highest-finishing CP car was Jack Eubank's Talbot-Lago in 3rd.
 D Production were classified with C Production at Riverside.
 J Production were classified with I Production at the Road America 500.
 D Production were classified with B Production at Daytona.
 F Modified were classified with E Modified at Daytona.

Champions

External links
World Sports Racing Prototypes: SCCA 1959
Racing Sports Cars: SCCA archive
Etceterini: 1959 program covers

SCCA National Sports Car Championship
Scca National Sports Car Championship
1959 in American motorsport